Downing may refer to:

Places 
 Downing, Missouri, US, a city
 Downing, Wisconsin, US, a village
 Downing Park (Newburgh, New York), US, a public park
 Downing, Flintshire, Wales

Buildings 
 Downing Centre, Sydney, New South Wales, Australia, a major courthouse complex
 Downing Hall, near Whitford, Flintshire, Wales
 Downing House (disambiguation), various houses on the US National Register of Historic Places
 Downing Stadium, New York City, US, a sports stadium closed in 2002

People 
 Downing (surname)
 Downing Gray (born 1938), American amateur golfer
 Downing Vaux (1856–1926), American landscape architect

Transportation 
 Downing Street, London, UK
 Downing Street, George Town, Penang, Malaysia
 Downing station, Downing, Missouri, US, a train station on the National Register of Historic Places
 Downing Motor Company, which manufactured the Downing-Detroit cyclecar from 1913 to 1915

Other uses 
 Downing College, Cambridge, UK
 Downing baronets, an extinct title in the Baronetage of England
 Clayton Downing Middle School, Flower Mound, Texas, US

See also 
 Downing Professor of the Laws of England, a University of Cambridge professorship
 Downing Professor of Medicine, a University of Cambridge professorship
 Downings, County Donegal, Ireland, a village and townland